Vengarai is a village in the Orathanadu taluk of Thanjavur district, Tamil Nadu, India.

Demographics 

As per the 2001 census, Vengarai had a total population of 1902 with 942 males and 960 females. The sex ratio was 1.019. The literacy rate was 62.15.

References 

 

Villages in Thanjavur district